Constance Marie Lopez (born September 9, 1965) is an American actress. She is best known for her roles as Angie Lopez in George Lopez (2002–2007), and Marcela Quintanilla (mother of Selena) in the film Selena (1997). She portrayed Regina Vasquez in the ABC Family/Freeform drama series Switched at Birth (2011–2017). She is currently portraying Camila Diaz in the Amazon Prime Video drama series Undone (2019).

Early life
Constance Marie was born and raised in East Los Angeles. At age 19, Marie appeared as a dancer in the musical Cosmopolis by composer Ryuichi Sakamoto in Japan. When she returned to Los Angeles, she was spotted at a club by a dance choreographer for David Bowie and she was hired for the Glass Spider Tour in 1987.

Career
Marie began her acting career when she was in her teenage years. She landed a spot in the 1988 film Salsa. Other television and film credits include Early Edition, Dirty Dancing, Selena, Spin City, and Ally McBeal. Marie was chosen for the role of Angie Lopez in the ABC comedy series George Lopez. In 2001, Marie starred in the comedy-drama film Tortilla Soup alongside Héctor Elizondo, Jacqueline Obradors, and Elizabeth Peña. She also appeared in the PBS drama series American Family.

In October 2007, she launched her own clothing line, "The Constance Marie Collection". In the same year, she appeared in an ad for PETA, encouraging people to spay and neuter their pets.

From 2011 to 2017, Marie had a starring role in the ABC Family/Freeform drama series Switched at Birth, portraying  Regina Vasquez, the birth mother of one of the girls and legal mother of the other.

Personal life
Marie was in a 15-year relationship with yoga instructor Kent Katich, which ended in September 2015. They have a daughter born in 2009. Marie is a longtime vegetarian and raised her child as a vegetarian.

Filmography

Awards and nominations
 Soap Opera Digest Awards
 1991: Outstanding Female Newcomer (Daytime) – Santa Barbara (Nominated)
 ALMA Awards
 1998: Outstanding Actress in a Comedy Series – Union Square (Nominated)
 2007: Outstanding Actress (Television Series, Mini-Series or Television Movie) – George Lopez (Nominated)
 2011: Favorite TV Actress - Supporting Role – Switched at Birth (Nominated)
 2012: Favorite TV Actress - Supporting Role – Switched at Birth (Won)
 Young Artist Awards
 2004: Most Popular Mom & Pop in a Television Series – George Lopez (Nominated) with George Lopez
 Imagen Awards
 2004: Best Actress in Television Drama – American Family (Nominated)
 2004: Best Actress in Television Comedy – George Lopez (Won)
 2005: Best Actress (Television) – George Lopez (Nominated)
 2006: Best Actress (Television) – George Lopez (Nominated)
 2007: Best Actress (Television) – George Lopez (Nominated)

See also

 List of Mexican Americans

References

External links

 
 

1965 births
Living people
Actresses from Los Angeles
American female dancers
American film actresses
American actresses of Mexican descent
American soap opera actresses
American television actresses
American voice actresses
Dancers from California
21st-century American women